Phycomorpha metachrysa, the milktree fruit moth, is a species of moth in the Copromorphidae family. It is endemic to New Zealand and has been found in the North and South Islands. The larvae feed on the fruit of species in the genus Streblus including Streblus heterophyllus. This adults of this species is on the wing from October to April.

Taxonomy 
This species was first described by Edward Meyrick in 1914 using specimens collected by George Howes in Dunedin in November and February. In 1928 George Hudson discussed and illustrated this species in his book The butterflies and moths of New Zealand. The lectotype specimen, collected in Dunedin, is in the collection of the Natural History Museum, London.

Description 

Meyrick described this species as follows:

The wingspan is 19–20 mm. Adults are dark green with raised scale-tufts on the forewings. Hudson states that this species is considerably variable with some specimens having forewings that are a dull olive green colour. Other specimens have a cream white patch on the dorsum which extends about halfway across the forewing. However, despite this variability this species is able to be recognised by its unusual antennae and the scale tufts on its forewings.

Distribution 

This species is endemic to New Zealand and is found in both the North and South Islands. It has been observed in its type locality of Dunedin, at the head of Lake Wakatipu and also in the Gollan Valley of Wellington and Kaeo in Northland. This species has also been found in a site of ecological significance, at Decanter Bay in Canterbury, as set out in the Christchurch District Plan.

Behaviour 
The adults of this species is on the wing from October until April.

Host species
The larvae feed on the fruit of Streblus species including Streblus heterophyllus.

References

Copromorphidae
Moths of New Zealand
Endemic fauna of New Zealand
Moths described in 1914
Taxa named by Edward Meyrick
Endemic moths of New Zealand